The Other Iraq is an advertising campaign created to promote commerce in the Kurdistan Region. It is run by the Kurdistan Development Corporation to promote investment and trade.

"Thank you" ads

Part of their promotions include a series of advertisements thanking the United States, the United Kingdom, and their allies for removing the regime of Saddam Hussein. The advertisements can be viewed from the promotional website.

Individuals and advisors involved
Masoud Barzani, the previous President of Kurdistan said: "The United States has never wavered in its quest to help Iraqis build a democracy that rewards compromise and consensus. The ever generous American people have paid a tragic price, the lives of their finest men and women, to advance the banner of freedom and democracy, a sacrifice for which we are profoundly grateful."

Others

 Douglas Layton, - Originator or THE OTHER IRAQ concept and public relations campaign and the Country Director of Kurdistan Development Corporation during the campaign
 Michael McNamara, – Penumbra /IMS – Video Production  of Thank You America commercial,  and related ads and mini documentaries
 MaxPaul Franklin - Project Cinematographer
 Jano Rosebiani - Kurdish Film Consultant
 Sal Russo, – Founder Russo Marsh and Rogers – Public Relations and Distributor
 Nijyar Shemdin, Kurdistan Regional Government Representative to the US, Canada, and the United Nations
 Brendan O'Leary, Constitutional Adviser to the Kurdistan Regional Government
 Karol Sultan, member of the Department of Government and Politics at the University of Maryland, College Park
 Bayan Sami Abdul Rahman, Kurdistan Regional Government Representative to the United Kingdom and Chairman of the Kurdistan Development Corporation
 Khaled Salih, Political Advisor to the Kurdistan Regional Government
 Nicholas Somerville, Executive Director of the Kurdistan Development Corporation 
 Peter Galbraith, Adviser to the Kurdistan Regional Government
 William Garaway, documentary producer William Garaway
 Matthew Freedman, long time Kurdish advocator and supporter

References

External links

 The Other Iraq
 The Iraq We Haven't Seen, The Washington Post
 The Other Iraq Tours

Economy of Iraq
Kurdistan Region (Iraq)
Advertising campaigns
Kurdish advertising slogans
Tourism in Iraq
2006 neologisms